R v Waterfield [1963] 3 All E.R. 659 is an English Court of Appeal decision, a court of binding precedent, outlining the modern limits of the law that authorises a police officer to stop (and then conceivably detain) a person.

This case produced what is known as the Waterfield test (incorporating the common law "ancillary power doctrine") for the limit of police authority to interfere with a person's liberty or property.

Facts
The police were investigating a reported incident of dangerous driving, where a car had rammed into a wall. It turned out that the car was owned by Eli Waterfield and driven by his friend, Geoffrey Lynn, but police were unable to make any arrests without further evidence.

One evening, while Lynn sat in the car at the local market, two police officers approached him to ask to search it. Lynn said he would leave. One of the officers said he would stop him if he tried. Waterfield arrived, told the police that they had no right to seize his car and told Lynn to drive away. The officers blocked the way, but Waterfield told Lynn to drive through the officers. Lynn drove forward, forcing the officer to jump out of the way.

Waterfield and Lynn were charged for assaulting a constable who was in the execution of his duty contrary to the Offences against the Person Act 1861.

Opinion of court 
Ashworth , for the court, held that the charge of assault was invalid and quashed the convictions. To come to this conclusion, the court made a key analysis of the requirements needed to show that a police officer was in the execution of his duties.

Footnotes and citations
Notes

References

See also

 English criminal law
 Criminal law
 List of Supreme Court of Judicature cases

External links
 Segments from the Judgement

W
1963 in British law
Court of Appeal (England and Wales) cases
1963 in case law